Lee Keo-ra (also Lee Gyeo-ra, ; born May 7, 1989) is a South Korean swimmer, who specialized in middle-distance freestyle events. She represented her nation South Korea at the 2008 Summer Olympics, and has won a bronze medal, as a member of the women's 4 × 200 m freestyle relay team, at the 2006 Asian Games in Doha, Qatar.

Lee competed for the South Korean swimming team in the women's 200 m freestyle at the 2008 Summer Olympics in Beijing. She finished with a thirty-first place time of 2:02.61 to earn her selection to the South Korea's Olympic team at the World Championships one year earlier in Melbourne, Australia, clearing the FINA B-cut (2:03.50) by almost a full second. Coming from seventh at the 150-metre lap in heat two, Lee held off a sprint challenge from Ireland's Melanie Nocher towards the final stretch, but could not catch her near the wall by over a full-body length to finish in dead-last with a disappointing 2:05.71. Lee failed to advance into the semifinals, as she placed forty-sixth overall in the prelims.

References

External links
NBC Olympics Profile

1989 births
Living people
South Korean female freestyle swimmers
Olympic swimmers of South Korea
Swimmers at the 2008 Summer Olympics
Swimmers at the 2006 Asian Games
Asian Games medalists in swimming
Sportspeople from Ulsan
Asian Games bronze medalists for South Korea
Medalists at the 2006 Asian Games
20th-century South Korean women
21st-century South Korean women